Vector is a 2012 platform game for Windows and Mobile developed and published by Cyprus-based studio Nekki. It is an arcade-styled parkour game with the objective being to break free from the cycle as a free runner.

Plot 
In Vector, players take the role of a silhouette who is constantly being pursued by another silhouette, seemingly some form of enforcer for the system the player character breaks out of. The game does not have a long story apart from the introduction video which reveals that the player character is a man in an Orwellian dystopia, no longer able to bend to the will of his masters. He casts aside his mind-control device and his shirt, and leaps from his skyscraper prison, sprinting across rooftops toward the distant horizon.

Reception 
Damien McFerran of Pocket Gamer rated the Android version 8/10 stars and wrote that Vectors playability makes up for its lack of innovation.  Slide to Play, in their review of the iOS version, wrote, "Vector is a fantastic free-running simulation with plenty to love", though the reviewer described the gameplay as "a bit repetitive at times".  Reviewing the Facebook version, Pete Davison of Adweeks SocialTimes blog called it "an impressive game in all respects" but said it needs better social features.  Leif Johnson, who reviewed the Facebook version for Gamezebo, rated it 4/5 stars.  Johnson described the gameplay as occasionally grindy but concluded that the game is "fun stuff, and much more challenging than your run-of-the mill Facebook fare."  Cameron Woolsey of GameSpot rated the PC version 7/10 stars and wrote that the game is "a fast-paced joyride" when it does annoy with its grind.

Legacy 

The game received a 2016 sequel titled Vector 2 that continues the storyline of the original. The protagonist from the first installment was eventually captured by security forces, but, instead of killing him, the antagonists decide to use his skills to test some new equipment in a secret research facility. When the protagonist dies, a new body is created for them. 

Gameplay similar to the previous game and several tricks return such as "Swallow", "Screwdriver", "Dash Vault", "Obstacle Jump", "Rocket Vault", "Ralflip Vault", "Reverse Vault" and many more.

Spinoffs
With the success of Vector, Nekki decided to create another game like it that used a silhouette as the main protagonist.  That game became a fighting game titled Shadow Fight, released exclusively on Facebook in 2011.  This spiritual successor to Vector eventually became a trilogy, spawning two sequels that became available on iOS and Android in 2014 and 2017.

References

External links 
 Official website

2012 video games
Android (operating system) games
IOS games
Side-scrolling platform games
Video games developed in Russia
Windows games
Parkour video games